Tarisai Musakanda (born 31 October 1994) is a Zimbabwean cricketer who plays for the Zimbabwe national cricket team. He was part of Zimbabwe's squad for the 2014 ICC Under-19 Cricket World Cup.

Domestic career
He made his List A debut in 2014 and his first-class debut in the same year.

In December 2018, during the opening round of the 2018–19 Logan Cup, Musakanda scored his maiden century in first-class cricket. In December 2020, he was named as the captain of the Rhinos for the 2020–21 Logan Cup.

International career
In October 2016 he was included in Zimbabwe's Test squad for their series against Sri Lanka. The following month he was included in Zimbabwe's One Day International (ODI) squad for the tri-series against Sri Lanka and the West Indies. He made his ODI debut in the final of the tri-series against Sri Lanka.

In February 2017, he was named in an academy squad by Zimbabwe Cricket to tour England later that year. He made his Test debut for Zimbabwe against Sri Lanka in their one-off Test in Colombo on 14 July 2017.

In June 2018, he was named in a Zimbabwe Select team for warm-up fixtures ahead of the 2018 Zimbabwe Tri-Nation Series. Later the same month, he was named in a 22-man preliminary Twenty20 International (T20I) squad for the tri-nation series. He made his T20I debut for Zimbabwe against Pakistan on 1 July 2018, during the tri-series.

In September 2018, he was named as the captain of Zimbabwe's squad for the 2018 Africa T20 Cup tournament. He was the leading run-scorer for Zimbabwe in the tournament, with 182 runs in four matches.

Personal life
In February 2022, Musakanda was charged with culpable homicide after failing to report a road accident in which a pedestrian was killed. The pedestrian was later identified as Gwinyai Chingoka, a Zimbabwean tennis player who went onto represent Zimbabwe at the Davis Cup.

References

External links
 

1994 births
Living people
Zimbabwean cricketers
Zimbabwe Test cricketers
Zimbabwe One Day International cricketers
Zimbabwe Twenty20 International cricketers
Sportspeople from Masvingo
Mid West Rhinos cricketers
Rising Stars cricketers
Zimbabwe Select XI cricketers